Attorney General Estabrook may refer to:

Charles E. Estabrook (1847–1918), Attorney General of Wisconsin
Experience Estabrook (1813–1894), Attorney General of Wisconsin